Verity! is a weekly podcast about the television show, Doctor Who as seen through the eyes of a rotating cast of six women. Verity! has a female-centered format and is a feminist podcast. It was nominated for the "Best Fancast" at the Hugo Awards in 2014 and 2018. The Verity! contributors are all Doctor Who fans and live in Canada, the United States, the United Kingdom and Australia. The show has been described as "intelligently fannish" and referenced as a recommended podcast.

History 
Verity! first aired January 2013. Deborah Stanish, the moderator of the podcast, met most of the other participants at conventions or other Doctor Who events or by working with them on non-fiction, Doctor Who-related books. Stanish wanted to hear the female and minority voices of Doctor Who fans and decided to start a podcast where several women could lend their view to the show and issues surrounding it. The format of having only women on the podcast made it stand out among the many other Doctor Who-related podcasts.

The podcast's name is a homage to Verity Lambert, the first producer of Doctor Who.

Content 
Verity! shows consist of a discussion of various topics touching on and about Doctor Who among the cast members. There is a "proper" episode every other week that is about an hour long and is based on a theme that the podcasters follow all year. The other episodes are shorter, about twenty to forty minutes and can be on any topic the women choose. Erika Ensign and Stanish participate in most episodes: Stanish is the moderator and Ensign does the technical work. The other four cast members rotate, except for large celebratory episodes where all six come together for the show. Each contributor to Verity! lives in a different part of the world, so they record in their own locations and are connected via a Skype call.

Verity! is not scripted, except for some contributors, like Ensign and Stanish, who use occasional notes in order to stay on topic. Overall, the show is not heavily edited and is meant to sound like a natural conversational flow.

In a January 2023 episode, the podcasters announced a hiatus, with an intention to return in some format later in 2023,

Cast members 
 Erika Ensign  (Edmonton, Alberta) – Former producer of the Apex Magazine Podcast, current co-producer of the Uncanny Magazine Podcast, and technical editor of Verity!
 Katrina (Kat) Griffiths (Edmonton, Alberta) – fan and writer.
 Liz (L.M.) Myles (Kirkcudbrightshire, Scotland) – contributor to Chicks Dig Time Lords, co-editor of Chicks Unravel Time and co-editor of Companion Piece (2015).
 Tansy Rayner Roberts (Hobart, Tasmania) – author of the Creature Court series and Hugo Award winner.
 Deborah (Deb) Stanish (Philadelphia, Pennsylvania) – co-editor of Whedonistas (2011) and co-editor of Chicks Unravel Time who moderates the panel discussion on Verity!
 Lynne M. Thomas (Urbana, Illinois) – a co-editor of Chicks Dig Time Lords: A Celebration of Doctor Who by the Women Who Love It (2010), Whedonistas (2011), and Chicks Dig Comics (2012), and a contributor to Chicks Unravel Time. She is also the former editor-in-chief of Apex Magazine, moderator of SF Squeecast, and current co-publisher and co-editor-in-chief of Uncanny Magazine.

References

External links 
 

Audio podcasts
Science fiction podcasts
Feminist podcasts
Works about Doctor Who
Doctor Who fandom
Film and television podcasts
2013 podcast debuts